Victoria Wezi Mhone (born 25 May 1992), known in music circles as Wezi or Wezi HeartSound, is a Zambian singer and songwriter. She rose to fame in 2016 after releasing her debut EP-Uhai which won her the 2016 new artist of the year at the Zambian music awards. Wezi release a song called "Isa Bantu Tyala" featuring Pilato and "Take My Heart", song cover, which was produced by Chali Bravo, released on 8 April 020.

Early life
Wezi is the second born daughter in a family of four from her parents pastor Royce chanje and the late Apostle Simon Mhone. She was raised by her uncle, her mother's elder brother on the Copperbelt province in Ndola, Zambia. She attended her primary education at North Rise basic school where she was the president of CHONGOLOLO CLUB and the leader of scripture Union with Zambian singer T Low and Namibian based youth leader Joseph Kalimbwe attending at the same school in Ndola. Wezi later attended and completed high school at Dominican convent secondary school where she was an active member of the drama club, Keep fit club & the president of Young Christian students (YCS). In 2013, she was enrolled into the school of humanities and social sciences at the University of Zambia.

Music career
Wezi officially signed her first record deal in 2013 with Bizzy Baila International which was co owned by Tsean and Tbwoy-Tbizzy.Under the record label, she released 3 singles Ambuya, Nipulumuseni and Tichitenji which was produced by T-Sean. She opted out of her contract in 2014 and later signed on to Vibrant media where she recorded several songs but non was released. Shortly after her deal with vibrant media, she joined MOJO Music where she was only able to release one song after several recordings. In 2016 she released her first EP -Uhia as an independent artist which won her the award for the best new artist at the 2016 Zambian music awards. In 2017, she was nominated for the kora awards. In 2018 she signed on to Elation Entertainment, a Zambian base record label. Wezi took part in the annual Stanbic bank music festival in Zambia in 2016, 2017 and 2018 where she perform alone side rnb group Boyz II Men and award-winning UK-based pop-reggae band UB40, Joe Thomas and Brian McKnight. In march 2018 she performed at the Lake of Stars Festival(LoS) held in London and Glasgow Scotland  as a headline act alongside the likes of Frightened Rabbits(England), M.anifest(Ghana), Faith Musa(Malawi). She later performed at the Harare International Arts Festival (HIFA) in Zimbabwe held between 1 and 6 May. In April, 2020 Wezi released a cover song called "Take My Heart" produced by Bravo and released another hit called "Ise Bantu Tyala" featuring Pilato.

Humanitarian work
In 2016, she attended the African Union summit and later on in the same year was appointed by the late Minister of Gender as Gender's ambassador on the campaigns against early child marriages & Gender based violence. Wezi served as an advocate for conservation of natural water sources after taking part in the 2017 World Wide Fund for Natural ( WWF) Journey of water.

Discography

Albums
Uhai (EP, 2016)

Single
"Ambuya"
"Tichitenji" 
"Nipulumuseni" 
"Nthenda" (featuring Jay Rox)
"Maplanga na nsimbi" 
"Translate"
"Nyimbo Zako" 
"Umung'O" (featuring Mumba Yachi)
"Anagaila" (cover with Kantu & Bombshell)
"Tiwepo"
"Nikukonda"
"Munanitema" (featuring cleo icequeen)
Ise Bantu Tyala ( featuring pilato)
Take heart my heart ( song cover)

References

1992 births
Living people
21st-century Zambian women singers